Kenyapotamus is a possible ancestor of living hippopotamuses that lived roughly 16 million to 8 million years ago during the Miocene epoch.  Its name reflects that its fossils were first found in modern-day Kenya.

Although little is known about Kenyapotamus, its dental pattern bore similarities to that of the genus Xenohyus, a European suid from the Early Miocene.  This led some scientists to conclude that hippopotami were most closely related to modern peccaries and suids.

Recent molecular research has suggested that hippopotamuses are more closely related to cetaceans than to other artiodactyls. A morphological analysis of fossil artiodactyls and whales, which also included Kenyapotamus, strongly supported a relationship between hippos and the anatomically similar family Anthracotheriidae. Two archaic whales (Pakicetus and Artiocetus) formed the sister group of the hippopotamid-anthracotheriid clade, but this relationship was weakly supported.

References

Extinct hippopotamuses
Miocene even-toed ungulates
Miocene mammals of Africa
Fossil taxa described in 1983
Prehistoric even-toed ungulate genera